Peter T. Edge is a retired American government official who last served as the executive associate director of the Office of Homeland Security Investigations and also served as the acting deputy director of the U.S. Office of Immigration and Customs Enforcement.

Career
Edge started his career as an investigator in the Essex County Prosecutor's Office in New Jersey. He gained experience as an investigator in his capacity as Special Agent in Charge of the Homeland Security Investigations office in Newark.

References

Living people
American prosecutors
United States Department of Homeland Security officials
Year of birth missing (living people)